The tenth and final season of Smallville, an American television series, premiered on September 24, 2010 and consisted of 22 episodes. It was the tenth and final season to air, and the fifth one to air on The CW television network. The series recounts the early adventures of Kryptonian Clark Kent as he adjusts to life in the fictional town of Smallville, Kansas, during the years before he becomes Superman.

Regular cast members during season ten include Tom Welling, Erica Durance, Justin Hartley, Cassidy Freeman, and Allison Mack. John Schneider, Annette O'Toole, John Glover, Laura Vandervoort, and Callum Blue all returned sporadically throughout the season as Jonathan Kent, Martha Kent, Lionel Luthor, Kara, and Zod respectively, while Michael Rosenbaum (Lex Luthor) and Aaron Ashmore (Jimmy Olsen) returned for the series finale.

In the final season of the series, season ten continues the romance first developed between Clark Kent and Lois Lane in season nine, as well as the continuation of Clark's trials, and the forging of his superhero identity "Superman". The season premiere was seen by 2.98 million U.S. viewers. The series finale aired on May 13, 2011. By the end of this season, Smallville had become the longest running science fiction television series in North America.

Episodes

Production

Development

On March 4, 2010, The CW announced that Smallville would be back for its tenth and final season, which would consist of 22 episodes. Tom Welling, Erica Durance, Cassidy Freeman, Callum Blue, and Justin Hartley were the only regular cast members from the previous season who were contracted for the tenth season; although Blue was not picked up for the second year of his deal. As Allison Mack's contract was reportedly not renewed before the end of season nine, her status was in question. To put doubts to rest, executive producer Brian Peterson told Entertainment Weekly'''s Michael Ausiello that he was "very optimistic" that Allison Mack would be back.

The studio's official press release was presented on May 20, 2010 and confirmed that Smallville would be remaining at its Friday, 8 p.m. time slot. It also revealed that Smallville would be reteaming with Supernatural, a series that was originally slotted just behind Smallville on Thursday nights for four seasons. The press release did not list Mack in the list of stars. On May 21, 2010, Mack released a statement confirming that she would not return as a series regular, but would return for multiple episodes to wind up her storyline. However, at the 2010 Comic-Con, Peterson stated that, despite her long absence and limited episode count, Mack would remain a series regular. Mack stated that her hope is that the character of Chloe will hold on to her integrity as the writers close out her storyline. For the actress, watching as her character matured over the years—from sacrificing the things she wanted for the sake of her friends, to finally reaching a point where she can strive to satisfy her own needs and wants—has been important for her. Tom Welling, who served as a part-time producer for season nine, was announced as a full executive producer for season ten. Welling was also set to direct two episodes during the season, and Justin Hartley was contracted to direct another episode.

Story
Souders and Peterson revealed that the theme for season ten will be "facing the ghosts of your past and how [the effect of seeing the past] helps you move on in the future"; as such, the return of previous cast members will play into this. Souders and Peterson also chose not to erase Lois's memory of Clark's secret, something she discovered in the season nine finale. Instead, Lois helped Clark do what he needs to do to get away and fulfill his destiny without telling him that she knows. The producers explained that there would be "some twists and turns" before Lois tells Clark that she knows. Initially helping Clark and Oliver at Watchtower, a secret from her past will define whether Tess ultimately ends on the side of good or bad. Chloe's ending will also be told "in a way that's fitting for Chloe." She will "sacrifice" herself for Oliver, who has been informed that she was killed. As a result, Oliver will spend much of the season looking for Chloe, trying to find who is behind her murder. In addition, Oliver is "literally and figuratively stripped down to his bare essence" early on this season.

Similar to season eight and nine, there will also be a new main villain. The producers revealed that Darkseid will fulfill this role for the final season, but will be a different incarnation than his comic book counterpart. They explained that Darkseid's presence will be felt throughout the whole season, but that he will not actually appear until near the end; unlike in previous seasons where the main villain was present from the start. Instead, Darkseid's minions—Granny Goodness, Desaad, Glorious Godfrey, and others to be named—will appear throughout the season as the physical presence for Clark to battle. That said, Darkseid will make an appearance in the season premiere, digitally created to start with, but with "more solid forms" making a short appearance by the third episode. The plan is for Darkseid's presence to be established as he takes over the bodies of various characters. The executive producers also wanted to take a look at the history of Smallville's Clark Kent in the 200th episode of the series. According to Peterson, "[The episode will] explore a little bit of the past, the present and the future. We kind of do a little look back to where we've been and we also take a look at where Clark is going."

When discussing how the series will end, Peterson stated that the creative team has had multiple visions of the finale episode since the show began. According to Peterson, there is the vision that series creators Miles Millar and Alfred Gough developed and shared with the team over the years. Then there is the vision that Peterson and the current set of executive producers have. The producer said that ultimately, the finale episode will be a combination of all their visions that he believes will not disappoint anyone. In addition, the producers stated that they "don't want to hold anything back" for this season, and "give the fans what they want to see".

Characters
With the season being the show's last, plans began to bring back previous cast members for at least one appearance. Welling expressed his interest in having Annette O'Toole (Martha Kent), John Schneider (Jonathan Kent), Michael Rosenbaum (Lex Luthor), Kristin Kreuk (Lana Lang), and Michael McKean (Perry White) return. Welling even stated that he was doing "everything [he] can to get Michael Rosenbaum back". For Welling, Rosenbaum was the only person he could have seen portraying Lex Luthor on the series. He said that the thing that he sees inspiring Clark to become Superman would be the return of Lex Luthor and the interaction between the two characters; he explained that you cannot have Superman without Lex Luthor. At the 2010 Comic-Con, Welling stated that Rosenbaum acknowledged the importance of Lex in the series and wanted to return in some degree for the show's final season, but that he needed to iron the details out. According to Welling, the series would tease early on that Lex would return with the introduction of bodies that Lex could tap into and heal himself later in life. Welling also stated that Lana could possibly have closure by season's end.

It was revealed on June 30, 2010, that John Schneider would be returning for the season premiere, and would ultimately film three total episodes for his return to the series. He would reprise his role in the episode "Kent", where Clark meets Jonathan Kent in an alternate universe. The actor would make his third guest appearance in the series finale, along with John Glover and Annette O'Toole. The producers also worked to bring John Glover back as Lionel Luthor, Lex's father; he later appeared for two episodes in late November. Laura Vandervoort, who portrayed Clark's Kryptonian cousin Kara in season seven would be returning for the season's third episode. According to Souders, Kara returns to Earth more as "Supergirl" and less as "Kara". Souders emphasized that because Kara's return is in a heroic capacity, also revealing her ability to fly to the world, Kara works on developing an alter-ego through the use of eyeglasses and a wig. In addition, Kara provides her own input into Clark's development of his "Superman" persona. On March 22, 2011, Michael Ausiello revealed that Vandervoort would return for the season's 20th episode, titled "Prophecy".

James Marsters was confirmed to be returning for the series' 200th episode. Marsters first appeared as Brainiac/Milton Fine in season five and again in seasons seven. This time, Marsters will be portraying Brainiac 5, the version of Brainiac from the future that the Legion of Super-Heroes created after removing the original version of Brainiac from Chloe's body in the season eight episode "Legion". In addition, both Michael Shanks and Jessica Parker Kennedy will return as Hawkman/Carter Hall and Plastique, respectively, in the second episode of season ten. Hawkman made a brief appearance in the season nine finale, while Plastique was last seen in season eight. The return of Carter Hall means a deeper look into who that character is, while seeing a "more human side" to him than previously seen. On August 11, it was announced that Michael Ironside and Peyton List would be returning for a mid-October episode. Ironside previously portrayed Lois's father, General Sam Lane; while List played Lois's sister, Lucy. Both characters were last seen in separate season four episodes. On September 7, 2010, it was revealed that Alan Ritchson would reprise the role of Arthur Curry/Aquaman in a November episode. Ritchson described his character's return as "darker" and less "bubble-gummy" than previously seen on the show.

On July 22, 2010, Michael Ausiello revealed that Cat Grant, a gossip columnist for the Daily Planet in the comic books, would be appearing as Clark's new partner during season ten. Ausiello stated that Grant would act more as a "comedic foil" for Clark, and is not intended to interrupt the relationship he has with Lois. Instead, Grant will act as Lois's professional rival, and is considered by the producers to be her opposite. Keri Lynn Pratt, who portrays Grant, stated that her character will have a crush on Clark, which will annoy Lois more than threaten her. Pratt described her characters motivations: "Cat really believes in what she's working on and her message. She just really wants to get that through and have everyone on the same page as her. She kind of loses track of the big picture".

This season was slated to see the introductions of villains Granny Goodness, Desaad, and Glorious Godfrey. Lindsay Hartley was cast as another of Darkseid's minions, Mad Harriet, who works for Granny Goodness. Hartley explained the traditional claws her characters wears are powered by kryptonite, which give her an advantage over Clark. Hartley also stated that Harriet is the leader of Granny Goodness' Female Furies.

In addition, Geoff Johns, who previously wrote the introductions for the Legion of Super-Heroes and the Justice Society of America, wrote an episode featuring the introduction of superheroes Blue Beetle and Booster Gold, along with Suicide Squad member Rick Flag. In an interview with Comic Book Resources TV, Johns noted that the version of Blue Beetle will be that of Jaime Reyes, and that Booster Gold will be modeled directly after his comic book counterpart, as far as personality and history. Johns also explained that the episode might also see the introduction of the second Blue Beetle Ted Kord. He admitted that his choice in which comic book character to introduce was based solely on his personal preference, as he is a fan of Blue Beetle and Booster Gold and has a history of writing for those characters. These introductions will come at a time when Clark needs to have interactions with the characters to "propel him forward". He noted that the two characters embody what Clark needs to learn: being in the public eye and fully accepting his alien heritage. Johns pointed out that Booster Gold is all about being in the spotlight, while Clark is not. At the same time, Blue Beetle is trying to understand the alien technology he has been given. Johns also stated that Booster's introduction will serve to show Clark that society needs a hero to look up to.

On January 21, 2011, it was announced that Eric Martsolf was cast as Booster Gold. Sebastian Spence was cast as the Ted Kord version of the Blue Beetle and Jaren Brandt Bartlett as the Jaime Reyes version. In addition to the return of Lois's father and sister, Teri Hatcher was cast as Lois's mother. Hatcher, who starred as Lois Lane for four seasons of Lois & Clark: The New Adventures of Superman, appeared in lost video footage that Lois discovers. Entertainment Weekly reported that Callum Blue will return for the 19th episode, "Dominion". On February 11, 2011, Michael Ausiello reported that after the back and forth speculation as to whether Rosenbaum would return to the series the actor finally agreed to appear in the series finale. Rosenbaum expressed that his return for the final episode was for the fans, stating, "I appreciate all of their passion, their relentlessness, and even their threats." On April 14, 2011, The Futon Critic's official CW press release announced the return of Chris Gauthier as Toyman.

Superman mythology
With a glimpse of the iconic Superman costume in the season nine finale, Peterson confirmed that the costume will return and play a more prominent role in the final season, even going as far as to hint that the last scene of Smallville will see Clark wearing it. The producers were able to acquire the Superman costume worn by Brandon Routh in Superman Returns. DC Comics offered the suit worn by Christopher Reeve, but Peterson explained, "[it] just didn't quite fit with our world." Welling promised long-time viewers that, "Our number one goal this year is to wrap it up in a way that will satisfy the fans and give them hope that Clark has gone on to become Superman." Executive producer Kelly Souders said that in order for Clark to do this, Clark has to "wrestle" with the internal things that are preventing him from being an "inspirational hope". Though Clark is still in his "dark hour", he will become Superman by the end of the season. Peterson explained, "This year... the palette of the show will grow brighter and what he wears... is going to change;" Clark will end up exploring his destiny and work toward his future of becoming a hero.

Broadcast and reception
The season ten premiere brought in 2.98 million viewers, the highest viewing figures The CW have had in the Friday 8–9 pm timeslot in over two years. The series finale brought in 3.02 million viewers. By the end of its tenth season, Smallville became the longest running science fiction television show in the United States; it broke the Guinness World Record held by Stargate SG-1. TV Guide ranked the series finale 5th in its review of the Top TV Episodes of 2011.

 Home media release 
The complete tenth season of Smallville was released on November 29, 2011 in North America in both DVD and Blu-ray format. The DVD and Blu-ray box set were also released in region 2 and region 4 on October 17, 2011 and April 4, 2012, respectively. The box set included various special features, including episode commentary, a documentary on the 200th episode called "Smallville'': Coming Home", a featurette on Clark's father/son relationships over the course of ten seasons titled "My Father, My Son", and the music video "How Do We Do".

Notes

References

External links

 
 
 Kryptonsite
 Season 10 on Smallville Wikia

10
2010 American television seasons
2011 American television seasons